C-82 may refer to:
 C-82 Packet, a United States Army Air Forces aircraft used after World War II

C82 may refer to :
 Corydoras loxozonus, a freshwater catfish
 Ruy Lopez chess openings ECO code
 Follicular lymphoma ICD-10 code
 Social Policy (Non-Metropolitan Territories) Convention, 1947 code
 Bresson Airport, a public use airport in Compton, Illinois, FAA LID
 Caldwell 82 (NGC 6193), an open cluster in the constellation Ara